Stiglmaierplatz is a square  in Maxvorstadt close to Munich city centre and a U-Bahn station on the U1, opened on

References

Munich U-Bahn stations
Railway stations in Germany opened in 1983
Buildings and structures completed in 1983
1983 establishments in West Germany